is a Japanese professional baseball outfielder for the Tohoku Rakuten Golden Eagles in Japan's Nippon Professional Baseball.

After the 2017 season, he joined Cañeros de Los Mochis.

Okoye's mother is Japanese and his father is Igbo from Nigeria. His younger sister Monica Okoye is a member of the Japan women's national basketball team which won a silver medal at the 2020 Olympics in Tokyo.

References

External links

NPB stats

1997 births
Living people
Cañeros de Los Mochis players
Japanese people of Nigerian descent
Sportspeople of Nigerian descent
Nippon Professional Baseball outfielders
People of Igbo descent
Tohoku Rakuten Golden Eagles players
Japanese expatriate baseball players in Mexico
Baseball people from Tokyo